The  2011 AFF U-19 Youth Championship was held from 8 September to 20 September 2011, hosted by Myanmar. All games were initially set to be played at the Thuwunna Stadium but the Aung San Stadium was also added to the match schedule due to unfavorable weather conditions that were forecast to persist for the opening stages which would be detrimental to the Thuwunna Stadium pitch.

Tournament 
All times are Myanmar Standard Time (MST) - UTC+6:30.

Group stage

Group A

Group B

Knockout stage

Semi-finals

Third place play-off

Final

Winner

Goalscorers 
8 goals
 Nguyễn Xuân Nam

4 goals

 Rahmat Saputro
 Zoel Fhadli
 Yan Naing Htwe
 Nguyễn Thanh Hiển

3 goals

 Phanny Rathas
 Syahru Ramadhan
 Lembo Saysana
 Thiha Zaw
 Fitch Arboleda
 Muhammad Akmal Ishak
 Muhammad Akram Mahinan
 Athit Wisetsilp
 Chalongchai Pothong

2 goals

 Prak Mony Udom
 Dian Ardiansyah
 Souliya Syphasay
 Muhammad Akhir Bahari
 Mohamad Ridzuan Abdunloh Pula
 Thinesh.C
 Jaturong Pimkoon
 Narubadin Weerawatnodom
 Pakorn Prempak
 Ho Sy Sam
 Que Ngoc Hai
 Phan Đình Thắng

1 goal

 Rous Samouen
 Rahmadana
 Phouthasin Luang Amath
 Sengdao Inthilath
 Sitthideth Khanthavong
 Souksadakone Liepvisay
 Xaisongkham Champathong
 Mohamad Syafiq
 Nur Areff Kamaruddin
 Soe Paing Thway
 Zayar Phyo Kyaw
 Ye Ko Ko
 Leo Liay
 Muhammad Nur Naiim Ishak
 Shannon Stephen
 Adisorn Promrak
 Itthipol Yodprom
 Nitipong Selanon
 Thitipan Puangchan
 Vittaya Niamhom
 Đỗ Hùng Dũng
 Nguyễn Tuân Vũ
 Nguyen Viet Phong

Own goal
 Naing Ko Lin (For Vietnam)
 Joseph Bellezon (For Malaysia)

References

External links 
 AFF U-19 Championship 2011 at AFF official website

Under
AFF
2011
2011
2011 in youth association football